The NER Class W1 was a 4-6-2T steam locomotive of the North Eastern Railway. The class was introduced in 1914 as a rebuild of Wilson Worsdell's NER Class W 4-6-0T (introduced 1907). At the 1923 Grouping, they all passed to the London and North Eastern Railway, who placed them in their Class A6.

Modifications
Seven of the locomotives were fitted with superheaters between 1937 and 1944.

British Railways
One locomotive was withdrawn in 1947 but the remaining nine passed to British Railways in 1948 and were numbered as follows:

 Superheated: 69791-69793 and 69796-69797
 Non-superheated: 69794-69795 and 69798

Withdrawal
One locomotive was withdrawn in 1947 and the others had all been withdrawn by the end of 1951. None are preserved.

References

4-6-2T locomotives
W1
Railway locomotives introduced in 1914
Scrapped locomotives
Standard gauge steam locomotives of Great Britain

Passenger locomotives